Taxuyunnanines is a class of taxoids isolated from plants of the genus Taxus.

References

Taxanes